Lodowick is a given name. Notable people with the name include:

Lodowick Bryskett, 16th-century Irish poet and translator
Lodowick Carlell (1602–1675), English playwright

See also
Lodowicke Muggleton (1609–1698), English plebeian religious thinker
Lozowick, a surname